Nitor pudibunda is a species of air-breathing land snail, a terrestrial pulmonate gastropod mollusk in the family Helicarionidae. This species is endemic to Australia.

Description
Cox's description of the shell of a specimen of N. pudibunda, published in A Monograph of Australian Land Shells, 1868.

Distribution
The species is found in eastern Australia, most commonly along the coasts of Queensland and New South Wales, from Cooloola to Lismore.

Notes and references

Notes
 Text contains some minor corrections and updates; no spaces before semicolons, showing instead of shewing, "." as decimal mark instead of "·", etc...
 In the publication Cox refers to Helix subrugata and Helix Moretonensis, meaning Nitor subrugata and Nitor moretonensis respectively. Helix subrugata and Helix moretonensis are accepted synonyms.

References

External links
 Encyclopedia of Life — Nitor pudibunda

Helicarionidae
Gastropods described in 1868